Jazmín Taborda is a  road cyclist from Ecuador. She became  Ecuadorian national road race and time trial champion in 2014.

References

External links
 profile at Procyclingstats.com

Ecuadorian female cyclists
Living people
Place of birth missing (living people)
Date of birth missing (living people)
Year of birth missing (living people)
21st-century Ecuadorian women